The Eldora Dirt Derby was a  annual race in the NASCAR Gander RV & Outdoors Truck Series race held at Eldora Speedway in Rossburg, Ohio. During its existence from 2013 to 2019, the race was the only dirt track racing event on any NASCAR national touring series (Cup, Xfinity, or Truck) schedule and the first since 1970.  Due to coronavirus concerns in 2020, the race was not run and is not scheduled to be run again in the Truck Series. The standalone dirt event was later moved to Knoxville Raceway for 2021.

History

On November 28, 2012, NASCAR announced the addition of a race at Eldora Speedway to the 2013 NASCAR Camping World Truck Series's schedule. The race would be the first on a dirt surface in any of NASCAR's national series since 1970, with the last being at the North Carolina State Fairgrounds in Raleigh, North Carolina.

The inaugural running of the event, which completely sold out in January 2013, was run on July 24, 2013. Austin Dillon won the event after retaining the lead on a green–white–checker finish.

The event was originally branded as the Mudsummer Classic, but was re-named for the 2016 edition due to a trademark dispute with Major League Baseball, as the league's All-Star Game is marketed with the trademark "Midsummer Classic". The event was ultimately re-named the Eldora Dirt Derby, with the 2016 edition being sponsored by Aspen Dental.

The 2020 race was canceled due to state restrictions on large gatherings as a safety measure against the COVID-19 pandemic. The Derby was removed from the schedule in 2021.

Format
There are five qualifying races, consisting of ten laps each, that determine the starting grid. However, driver's starting positions in the qualifying races are determined by normal two-lap qualifying sessions. Caution laps in the qualifying races are not scored, and five trucks will transfer from each qualifying race. After the five races, a total of 25 trucks will have qualified for the feature (the main event). Another race, named the 'Last Chance Race', consists of 15 laps, and determines the lineup from position 26 to 29. The final position on the grid is awarded to the most recent Camping World Truck Series champion, unless there is no beneficiary to that position. In that case, the fifth-place finisher in the 'Last Chance Race' is awarded the final starting position. The main event, or feature, is 150 laps long, with three segments of 40, 50 and 60 laps. During each break, drivers are allowed to make pit stops.

In 2014, the format was changed. Instead of lasting eight laps, the heat races will now consist of ten laps, with the top five teams failing to qualify for the Main Feature being awarded owners' points. Additionally, drivers are no longer required to pit.

Following the abolition of the "all exempt" tour format in 2015, the last chance format changed.  Only the top drivers advance to the feature from the Last Chance race, for a net of 27 cars.  The remaining five trucks in the field will be filled by NASCAR's provisional starting regulations;  trucks in the top four in owner points standings that have not qualified for the race, and then the most recent Truck Series driver champion not in the field if necessary, or if not, the fifth-place truck in owner points standings of those not qualified.

Past winners

Qualifying races

"Last Chance" qualifying race

Feature (Main Event)

2013, 2015 and 2018: The race was extended due to a NASCAR Overtime finish.
2020: Race cancelled and moved to Kansas due to the COVID-19 pandemic.

Multiple Feature winners (teams)

Manufacturer wins

Tuesday Night Tailgate
The Tuesday Night Tailgate is the supporting event to the Mudsummer Classic featuring pre-race technical inspection for the Truck Series teams. From 2014 to 2015, the event included the Sunoco American Late Model Series. In 2016, the event will feature the Super DIRTcar Series Big Block Modifieds, which will return to Eldora for the first time since 2006.

Past winners

References

External links
 

2013 establishments in Ohio
NASCAR races at Eldora Speedway
Former NASCAR races
NASCAR Truck Series races
Recurring sporting events established in 2013
July sporting events
Recurring sporting events disestablished in 2020